No Backup, released in May 1996, is the first album by Farmers Manual. A remastered 2nd edition was reprinted in August 1999.

Track listing
"Macro Woeb" - 5:54
"Biomagic I" - 6:45
"Biomagic II" - 7:19
"Perimeter 87" - 9:38
"Nomad 137" - 7:51
"Farmers Manual" - 5:59
"Flight III" - 6:14
"Take" - 2:18

Notes
The album contains a CD-ROM part, consisting in 120 MB of interactive graphics (playable on Mac OS only).

References

External links
Farmers Manual discography (up to 1998)

Farmers Manual albums
1996 albums